Meland is a former municipality in the Nordhordland district in the old Hordaland county, Norway.  The municipality existed from 1923 until its dissolution on 1 January 2020 when it was merged into the new Alver Municipality in Vestland county. The municipality was located about 30 minutes north of the city of Bergen in Western Norway. The island municipality was mostly located on the island of Holsnøy, where the administrative centre of Frekhaug is located. Other villages in Meland include Hjartås, Holme, Io, Krossneset, Meland, and Rossland.

Prior to its dissolution in 2020, the  municipality is the 386th largest by area out of the 422 municipalities in Norway. Meland is the 135th most populous municipality in Norway with a population of 8,021.

General information

On 15 October 1923, the western part of the municipality of Alversund was separated to create the new municipality of Meland. Meland was one of many municipalities in Norway that were created for geographical reasons: Meland was separated from the rest of Alversund by the Radfjorden, and transportation between the different parts of the municipality was unreliable and time-consuming. The creation of the municipality was approved in 1922, and the first election for the municipal council was held 23 August 1923, with the municipality becoming official on 15 October 1923. Meland encompassed the southern two-thirds of the island of Holsnøy (the northern third belonged to Herdla municipality), a small area on the northeast coast of the island of Askøy, as well as some very small surrounding islands.

In 1962, the Schei Committee concluded its survey of the organization of Norway's municipalities. The committee recommended enlarging Meland municipality by transferring the northern part of Holsnøy and the minor island of Øpsøy (population: 811) from Herdla municipality to Meland, and the island of Flatøy (population: 166) was transferred from Hamre municipality to Meland. Simultaneously, Meland would lose the parts of the municipality located on the island of Askøy and that area would go to Askøy Municipality. Hordaland county approved the move, and the border changes came into effect on 1 January 1964. A proposal to change the name of Meland municipality to "Holsenøy" was rejected. Hamre and Herdla municipalities ceased to exist, and their territory was divided between the municipalities of Lindås, Osterøy, and Meland, and Askøy, Øygarden, and Meland, respectively.

On 1 January 2020, the neighboring municipalities of Meland, Radøy, and Lindås were merged into a large, new municipality called Alver.

Name
The municipality is named after the old Meland farm in the south-central part of the island of Holsnøy. The Old Norse name of the farm was "Meðalland". "Meðal" means "middle" while "land" means "farm" or "land", so that the name as a whole roughly means "the farm that is located in the middle (of the island)". The name was spelled Mæland historically.

Coat of arms
The coat of arms was granted on 15 May 1987. The arms show a local type of auger which is used in carpentry. In the 1850s, auger manufacturing started in the municipality, and the local drills were considered to be high quality. The auger is gray and it is on a red background.

Churches
The Church of Norway had one parish within the municipality of Meland. It is part of the Nordhordland prosti (deanery) in the Diocese of Bjørgvin.

Geography
Meland consisted of a number of islands. Holsnøy is located between the island of Radøy and the Lindås peninsula to its north, the Åsane peninsula in Bergen to its east, the island of Askøy to its south, and the archipelago of Øygarden to its west. It is surrounded by fjords, namely (clockwise from north) Mangerfjorden, Radfjorden, Salhusfjorden, Herdlefjorden, and Hjeltefjorden. The second largest island in the municipality is Flatøy, located west of Holsnøy. The municipality also encompasses a number of minor islands.

The administrative centre of the municipality is the village of Frekhaug, which is its largest settlement. Frekhaug is located in the south-eastern part of Holsnøy, and its urban area had a population of 1649 as of 2012. An additional two urban areas are located in the municipality: Krossneset on Flatøy (population 468) and Holme (population 663).

Transport
As an island municipality, the road network of Meland depended upon bridges to connect it to the mainland. The Nordhordland Bridge, which spans the Salhusfjorden between Flatøy and Klauvaneset in Bergen, connects Meland to the mainland. The bridge is the main road northwards from Bergen, and is part of European route E39. The Krossnessundet Bridge, which is part of Fv 564, connects Flatøy to Holsnøy, the largest island of the municipality. The Krossnessundet Bridge opened in 1977, while the Nordhordland Bridge dates from 1994.  The Hagelsund Bridge connects the island of Flatøy to Knarvik on the Lindås peninsula to the east.

History
{{Historical populations
|footnote = Source: Statistics Norway.
|shading = off
|1951|1930
|1960|1721
|1970|2694
|1980|3508
|1990|4534
|2000|5353
|2010|6613
|2017|8021
}}
Meland had several traces of early settlement, including remnants of stone houses, terraced walls, and farms. Holmeknappen'' (from the 18th century) was restored in 1992, and it includes equipment for barrel production and salting herring. Meland has been a church site since the mid-13th century. The stave church on this site was in use until 1616 when a new wooden church was built on the same site. That church was demolished in 1816 and the new (present) Meland Church was erected in 1816.

Government
All municipalities in Norway, including Meland, are responsible for primary education (through 10th grade), outpatient health services, senior citizen services, unemployment and other social services, zoning, economic development, and municipal roads. The municipality is governed by a municipal council of elected representatives, which in turn elect a mayor.  The municipality falls under the Bergen District Court and the Gulating Court of Appeal.

Municipal council
The municipal council  of Meland was made up of 27 representatives that are elected to four year terms. The party breakdown of the final municipal council was as follows:

Notable people

See also
List of former municipalities of Norway

References

External links

Municipal fact sheet from Statistics Norway 

 
Alver (municipality)
Former municipalities of Norway
1923 establishments in Norway
2020 disestablishments in Norway